20 Dakika ("20 Minutes") is a Turkish television drama series broadcast on Star TV. This story talks about a beautiful family. A father, mother, daughter and a son that lived together in happiness and peace. One day, the police stormed in and took the mother (Tuba Buykustun) to jail. She was suspected of committing a murder and sentenced to 20 years in prison. Her husband (Ilker Aksum) tries to prove her innocence while at the same time the criminal investigator (Firat Celik) tried to find as much evidence as he can to find out the truth. But the big question is did she really commit the murder?

Cast and characters 
 Tuba Büyüküstün as Melek Halaskar
 İlker Aksum as Ali Halaskar
 Fırat Çelik as  Ozan Çevikoğlu
 Bülent Emin Yarar as Mesut Bilaloğlu (Kedi)
 Ayten Uncuoğlu as Zeynep Halaskar
 Cihat Tamer as Nedim Halaskar
 İpek Bilgin as Muavin Süreyya Gürok
 Müjde Uzman as Kuzgun
 Defne Kayalar as Derin Solmaz
 Bahadir Ünlü

Episodes

Awards

International broadcast

See also
Television in Turkey
List of Turkish television series
Turkish television drama

References

External links 

 
 

2013 Turkish television series debuts
2013 Turkish television series endings
Television series by Ay Yapım
LGBT-related drama television series
Star TV (Turkey) original programming
Turkish drama television series
Nonlinear narrative television series